Brittney Cooper is a tenured professor of Women and Gender Studies, author, professor, activist, and cultural critic. Her areas of research and work include black women organizations, black women intellectuals, and hip-hop feminism. In 2013 and 2014, she was named to the Root.com's Root 100, an annual list of top Black influencers.

Personal life and education 
Cooper is from Ruston, Louisiana.

She received a Bachelor of Arts degree in English and Political Science from Howard University in May 2002. Cooper graduated from Howard's honors program with her senior thesis in English.

After graduating from Howard University, Cooper attended Emory University, where she received her Master of Arts from the Graduate Institute of Liberal Arts in December 2007. She received her PhD in American Studies, in addition to a Women's Studies Certificate, from Emory's Graduate Institute of Liberal Arts in May 2009.

Career 
Cooper currently works as an associate professor of women's and gender studies and Africana studies at Rutgers University-New Brunswick. She is a co-founder of the Crunk Feminist Collective and co-editor of the collection of essays of the same title, which explore intersectionality, African-American culture, and hip-hop feminism.

She has also been an assistant professor at the University of Alabama in the Department of Gender and Race Studies from 2009 to 2012, and she was a Ford Foundation Postdoctoral Fellow at Rutgers University's Center for Race and Ethnicity from 2011 to 2012.

Publications 
Cooper has written three books.

Her first book was Beyond Respectability: The Intellectual Thought of Race Women, published in 2017 by University of Illinois Press. A book review from National Public Radio (NPR) called Beyond Respectability "a work of crucial cultural study."

Cooper also co-authored and edited The Crunk Feminist Collection (published in 2017 by The Feminist Press at City University of New York) along with Susana M. Morris and Robin M. Boylorn. The book collection received positive acclaim from Publishers Weekly, Kirkus Reviews, Literary Hub, and Ebony. The collection is a series of essays that originated on the blog The Crunk Feminist Collective, which Cooper co-founded.

In 2018, her book Eloquent Rage: A Black Feminist Discovers Her Superpower was published by St. Martin's Press. In it, Cooper explores black feminism and anger, specifically the anger of black women, as a basis for revolutionary action.

Books
The Crunk Feminist Collection (2017) 
Beyond Respectability: The Intellectual Thought of Race Women (2017) 
Eloquent Rage: A Black Feminist Discovers Her Superpower (2018)

See also 

 Ratchet feminism

References

External links

Feminist studies scholars
American feminist writers
African-American feminists
African-American social scientists
Rutgers University faculty
Howard University alumni
Emory University alumni
People from Ruston, Louisiana
Living people
Year of birth missing (living people)
21st-century African-American people
21st-century African-American women